Gianluca Vizziello (born 3 March 1980 in Policoro) is an Italian motorcycle racer. He currently competes in the CIV Supersport Championship aboard a Kawasaki ZX-6R.

Career

FIM Superstock 1000 Cup

In 2000 Vizziello made his debut in the FIM Superstock 1000 Cup. He made four starts that season with a best finish of fifth at Oschersleben. In 2001 Vizziello competed full-time in the championship and finished sixth in the standings. Vizziello got his first win in 2002, winning the round at Misano. With additional strong results he finished third in the championship that season. 2003 was an up and down season for Vizziello and he dropped to sixth in the championship. Vizziello had an incredibly strong 2004 season. He won 5 of the first seven races and finished second in the other two races. But after being unable to participate in the final two rounds of the season he missed out on the title by 9 points.

Superbike World Championship

Vizziello moved up to the Superbike World Championship for 2005, riding a Yamaha YZF-R1 for the Italia Lorenzini by Leoni team. Vizziello endured a difficult rookie season as he only scored points three times with a best finish of 10th at Imola. He finished 28th in the championship with 9 points. Vizziello made a surprise return to the Superbike World Championship midway through the 2015 season, riding a Kawasaki ZX-10R for the Grillini SBK Team for the remainder of the season. He scored 13 points with a best finish of eleventh at Magny-Cours. Vizziello substituted for Román Ramos at the 2016 rounds of Imola and Sepang after Ramos got injured in second free practice at Imola. Later that season Vizziello rejoined the Grillini Racing Team for the remainder of the season.

Supersport World Championship

Vizziello moved down to the Supersport World Championship for 2006, riding a Yamaha YZF-R6 for Yamaha Team Italia. Vizziello had a solid rookie season and finished 9th in the championship with a best finish of fourth at Imola. Vizziello moved to the RG Team for 2007 and had an up and down season with a best finish of fourth at Magny-Cours. He finished 10th in the championship that year. Vizziello moved to Berry Racing for the 2008 season riding a Honda CBR600RR. Vizziello could not improve on his previous seasons but he did score his first fastest lap at Assen. Vizziello moved to the team of Johan Stigefelt for the 2009 season. He had a difficult season and Vizziello had to step out of the championship after the Nürburgring round due to the economic situation of the team combined with disappointing results. For the next two years Vizziello sporadically appeared in the championship starting in three races.

Career statistics

Superbike World Championship

Races by year

Supersport World Championship

Races by year

References

External links
Profile on WorldSBK.com

1980 births
Living people
Italian motorcycle racers
Superbike World Championship riders
Supersport World Championship riders
FIM Superstock 1000 Cup riders